Love the Sinner is a play by Drew Pautz. It received its world premiere at the Royal National's Cottesloe Theatre on 11 May 2010. The production was directed by Matthew Dunster, with music by Jules Maxwell and sound design by Paul Arditti. The show played its final performance at the Cottesloe Theatre on 10 July 2010.

Original Cast
Joseph - Fiston Barek
John / Rev Farley - Paul Bentall
Hannah / Alison - Nancy Crane
Michael - Jonathan Cullen
Tom / Bill - Sam Graham
Matthew / Harry - Robert Gwilym
Daniel -Scott Handy
James / Dave - Fraser James
Paul - Louis Mahoney
Shelly - Charlotte Randle
Stephen - Ian Redford
Simon / Official - Richard Rees

References

British plays
2010 plays
LGBT-related plays